Pauline Rhodd-Cummings (August 24, 1945 – January 27, 2002) was an American politician from New York.

Early life
Rhodd-Cummings was born Pauline Grace Monica Rhodd on August 24, 1945 in Jamaica, the daughter of Roy Rhodd (1917–2003). She emigrated to the United States in 1968, and settled in Queens. She married Michael Cummings, and they had one daughter.

Career 
She became active in community work, and entered politics as a Democrat. On March 24, 1998, she won a special election to fill the vacancy in the New York State Assembly caused by the election of Gregory Meeks to the U.S. Congress She was re-elected twice and remained in the Assembly until her death in 2002, sitting in the 192nd, 193rd and 194th New York State Legislatures.

On June 3, 2003, a street in Queens was named "Pauline Rhodd-Cummings Drive" in her honor.

Death 
She died on January 27, 2002, at her home in Far Rockaway, Queens, of cancer; and was buried at the Maple Grove Cemetery in Kew Gardens, Queens.

References

1945 births
2002 deaths
People from Queens, New York
Democratic Party members of the New York State Assembly
Women state legislators in New York (state)
Jamaican emigrants to the United States
20th-century American politicians
20th-century American women politicians